Juan-Luis Montero (born 28 April 1971 in Bar-sur-Seine) is a French former professional footballer who played as defender between 1990 and 2010. He was most recently the manager of Saint-Quentin.

He played his entire career in France for Troyes AC, FC Lorient, CS Sedan Ardennes, En Avant de Guingamp, Clermont Foot, Toulouse Fontaines Club and Sainte-Savine Rivière de Corps.

Managerial career
In June 2017 he became manager of FCA Troyes. He left the position in the summer 2019 and instead became head coach of FCM Troyes.

In February 2020, he was appointed manager of Saint-Quentin. He left the club at the end of the curtailed 2020–21 season.

References

External links
 

1971 births
Living people
People from Bar-sur-Seine
French people of Spanish descent
Sportspeople from Aube
Footballers from Grand Est
French footballers
Association football defenders
Ligue 1 players
Ligue 2 players
ES Troyes AC players
FC Lorient players
CS Sedan Ardennes players
En Avant Guingamp players
Clermont Foot players
Toulouse Fontaines Club players
Real Sociedad footballers
Stade Brestois 29 players
French football managers
Olympique Saint-Quentin managers
Tarbes Pyrénées Football managers
French expatriate footballers
French expatriate sportspeople in Spain
Expatriate footballers in Spain